The saccular nerve is a nerve which supplies the macula of the saccule.

References

External links

Ear